Layia elegans is a species of flowering plants in the family Asteraceae. It is found in California.

References

External links 

elegans
Plants described in 1843
Flora of California
Flora without expected TNC conservation status